Lindsay Ellis may refer to:
Lindsay Ellis (footballer) (born 1935), a former Australian rules footballer who played with Footscray in the Victorian Football League
Lindsay Ellis (media critic) (born 1984), an American media critic, film critic, and YouTuber